Inter-University Students' Federation is a confederation of students' unions across Sri Lanka. Around 70 students' unions are affiliated with the confederation, accounting for more than 95% of all higher and further education unions in Sri Lanka. The IUSF is the organization that is given leadership to whole university students in Sri Lanka. It is the largest student organization in Sri Lanka to date. It represents the voice of student councils and action committees in 15 higher education institutes including all major universities and technical colleges in Sri Lanka.

Overview
The IUSF consists of several student unions representing main universities and action committees of several universities across Sri Lanka. The sole official of the union is known as the convener. The convener carries out all administrative and legal work on behalf of the union.

The Inter University Bhikku Federation is an organization affiliated with the IUSF.

History

Establishment
The Inter-University Student Federation was established on 18 June 1969 at the University of Peradeniya. The first discussion was held at Ramanathan Hall, University of Peradeniya. It was financed by Vice Chancellor Prof. E. O. E. Pereira. Malcolm Wijesinghe of the Peradeniya University Students' Union was the first convener of the IUSF. He was also the President of the Sri Lanka Freedom Party's Progressive Students Union.

The IUSF became formally active in the mid-70s. This eventually culminated in the shooting and death of Rohana Weerasuriya by the police on November 12, 1976, at the University of Peradeniya. With the assassination of Weerasuriya, student groups loyal to the Janatha Vimukthi Peramuna (JVP) were able to gain control of the IUSF, which had previously been in the possession of the Ceylon National Students' Union of the Communist Party of Sri Lanka since 1972. The JVP Socialist Students Union's control over the IUSF lasted from 1976 to 2012.

Today, about 10 members of the JVP Socialist Students' Union and about 35 members of the Frontline Socialist Party's Revolutionary Students' Union are engaged in politics full time in universities. With a formation of a leftist mass movement, Shantha Bandara, a student in the science faculty of University of Peradeniya, was elected as its convener after reforms in 1977. The IUSF was officially recognized by the government on July 8, 1988, after its inception in 1969. Accordingly, the first official discussion was held on 23 July 1988, with the then-incumbent Minister of Higher Education, Abdul Cader Shahul Hameed, at the University Grants Commission in Sri Lanka.

Protests and campaigns
In recent times, most of its campaigns have been against the planned privatization of education institutions, claiming these plans were a threat to the free education of Sri Lanka which has existed in the country since 1945.

Notable leaders
 Shantha Bandara –  Former convener of IUSF after 1977 reforms. Drop-out of University of Peradeniya and a prominent leader of JVP. Involved in the unsuccessful JVP insurrection of 1987–1989. Killed in January 1990.
 Sunil Handunnetti – Former convener of the IUSF, former Member of Parliament from Colombo District, member of the central committee of JVP and contested the 2010 Sri Lankan parliamentary elections as part of the Democratic National Alliance (DNA) led by former army chief Sarath Fonseka.
 Ranjitham Gunaratnam – Former convener of the IUSF and drop out of the Faculty of Engineering, University of Peradeniya. He was the leader of the Peradeniya AC (Action Committee) in 1985, a JVP Central Committee Member and its leader in the Kurunegala District. Gunaratnam was abducted in December 1989, detained, tortured and killed at Wehera, Kurunegala. Corrections required here: Ranjtham Gunaratnam was not the leader of Peradeniya AC in 1985. The leader (we called the position as convener) of Peradeniya AC in 1985 was Gunapala Gajanayake, a student from the Faculty of Engineering. He was not a member of the JVP or its student arm, Samajavadee Sishya Sangamaya (Socialist Student Union) like Ranjitham.
Wansanatha Srilal Wijesinghe – Convener of the IUSF from 1996 to 1998.
 Ravindra Mudalige – Former convener of the IUSF.
 Chameera Koswatta – Former convener of the IUSF, JVP Chief Ministerial candidate for the Sabaragamuwa Province in the 2008 provincial elections.
 Duminda Nagamuwa – Convener of the IUSF from May 2004 to February 2008, drop-out of the Faculty of Science, University of Peradeniya and JVP Chief Ministerial candidate for the Western Province in the 2009 provincial elections.
 Udul Premaratne – Convener of the IUSF from February 2008 to January 2011, drop-out of the Faculty of Dental Sciences, University of Peradeniya.
 Sanjeewa Bandara – Former convener of the IUSF. A student of University of Ruhuna.
 Najith Indika – Former convener of the IUSF. A student of the Colombo University Medical Faculty.
Lahiru Weerasekara – Convener of the IUSF from 2015 to November 2018.
Wasantha Mudalige – Current convener of the IUSF and a prominent figure in the 2022 Sri Lankan protests against the Rajapaksa family government. Arrested by the Sri Lanka Police on 18 August 2022, a move which met much condemnation.

Criticism
Conduct of the student union has drawn much controversy in media and university administrations. The University of Jaffna banned the IUSF from entering university premises in June 2010, and other universities such as the University of Colombo and University of Moratuwa have taken steps to ban the student group from their universities in the past.

Strikes
The IUSF admitted to using strikes as its primary method to meet their demands, as it sees "no other plausible way". This has raised number of issues regarding the student discipline. Boycotting lectures has caused delays in student graduation time and cancellation of studentships on a number of occasions.

Ragging

The IUSF has also been criticized for not taking necessary action against ragging in Sri Lankan universities. Rival groups such as International Students for Social Equality have alleged that the IUSF itself uses ragging as a means of threatening new members and attracting a following among more backward students. Initially, senior students claimed that ragging served as a social equalizer in the universities, but with the emergence of JVP-backed student unions such as the IUSF, ragging has served primarily to ensure the continuing domination of JVP political power within universities, according to academics.

The IUSF has been accused of the murder of Samantha Vithanage, a third year Management student of the University of Sri Jayewardenepura, who pioneered an anti-ragging campaign in the university.

Political intolerance

Violence in universities has steadily increased due to political intolerance. The IUSF has been accused of obstructing and engineering clashes with rival political groups inside universities. In 2009, Prof. Nalin de Silva – Dean of the Faculty of Science at the University of Kelaniya – complained that pro-JVP IUSF students have sent him death threats for not agreeing to their political ideologies.

Picketing
Picketing is another form of protest employed by the IUSF to meet their demands by forcing the government. The purpose of most of those protests refer to the protection of the "Free Education System" and protecting students' rights. Picketings around Lipton Circus, Maradana and the country's busiest suburbs have become common in recent times. These picketings usually cause traffic jams and chaos in cities, with police using tear gas and water cannons to disperse gatherings, and generally cause public inconvenience.

References

External links
 Inter University Students' Federation official website

1978 establishments in Sri Lanka
Students' unions in Sri Lanka
Student organizations established in 1978
Student wings of communist parties